Gianluca Di Giulio (born 17 February 1972) is a former Italian footballer. He played for Benevento, Rimini and Verona.

Di Giulio joined Hellas Verona F.C. in June 2006 on free transfer. He left for Gallipoli in January 2007. In December 2007 he terminated his contract with Verona.

References

Living people
1972 births
Italian footballers
Hellas Verona F.C. players
Rimini F.C. 1912 players
Benevento Calcio players
Association football midfielders
U.S. Castrovillari Calcio players